Giannis Galitsios (Greek: Γιάννης Γκαλίτσιος; born 15 May 1958) is a Greek former professional footballer who played as a centre-back.

Club career
Galitsios played only for AE Larissa, in 399 official League games (holding the team's all-time appearance record) and he is considered to be one of the club's best ever. He is also the longest serving captain in club's history. Galitsios is also a retired professional firefighter.

Giannis' son Georgios Galitsios is also a footballer, having played for K.S.C. Lokeren Oost-Vlaanderen after spending four years with AEL.

International career
Galitsios appeared in 17 matches for the senior Greece national football team from 1982 to 1984.

Honours
AEL
 Greek Championship (1): 1987–88
 Greek Cup: 1985

References

1958 births
Living people
Footballers from Larissa
Greek footballers
Greece international footballers
Association football central defenders
Athlitiki Enosi Larissa F.C. players
Trikala F.C. players